The National Society of Film Critics Award for Best Supporting Actress is one of the annual awards given by the National Society of Film Critics.

Winners

 † = Winner of the Academy Award for Best Supporting Actress
 ‡ = Nominated for the Academy Award for Best Supporting Actress
 ¥ = Winner of the Academy Award for Best Actress
 § = Nominated for the Academy Award for Best Actress

1960

1970

1980s

1990s

2000s

2010s

2020s

Trivia
Jodie Foster is the youngest winner in this category, winning the award at age 13 for Taxi Driver (1976). In 2009, Mo'Nique became the first African-American to win in this category for Precious.

Multiple awards
3 wins
 Meryl Streep (1978, 1979, 2006)

2 wins
 Amy Adams (2005, 2012)
 Patricia Clarkson (2002, 2003)
 Anjelica Huston (1985, 1989)
 Dianne Wiest (1986, 1994)

See also
 National Board of Review Award for Best Supporting Actress
 New York Film Critics Circle Award for Best Supporting Actress
 Los Angeles Film Critics Association Award for Best Supporting Actress

References

External links

National Society of Film Critics Awards
Film awards for supporting actress